Miland is a small village in Tinn, Norway with a population of 388.

Villages in Vestfold og Telemark